Mojtín is a village and municipality in Púchov District in the Trenčín Region of north-western Slovakia. László Skultéty-Gábriš, the oldest Hungarian hussar, was born here.

Etymology
The name is derived from the Slavic personal name Mojtech with the possessive suffix -in.

History
In historical records the village was first mentioned in 1208 as Motie, in 1265 as Moythe, in 1364 as Moite, in 1397 as Mahtyn, in 1465 as Mayten, in 1472 as Moythin, in 1496 as Moythyn, after until 1899 as Mojtény, then Hegyesmajtény. As part of Czechoslovakia, Slovakia, Mojtín has been its official name. Since the 16th century the village became part of Pruzsina (a larger territory surrounding today's Pružina) until 1863.

Geography
The municipality lies at an altitude of 636 metres and covers an area of 10.842 km2. It has a population of about 575 people.

References

External links
 
 
http://www.statistics.sk/mosmis/eng/run.html

Villages and municipalities in Púchov District